Hindi Nahahati ang Langit (English: An Indivisible Heaven) is a 1985 Filipino romantic drama film directed by Mike de Leon, story by Nerissa Cabral, and produced by Charo Santos-Concio and Simon Ongpin for Vanguard Films. Adapted into a written screenplay by Mia A. Concio from the Tagalog Klasiks serial of the same name by Nerissa G. Cabral. The film stars Christopher de Leon and Lorna Tolentino as step-siblings Noel and Melody and also starring Dina Bonnevie and Edu Manzano as Noel and Melody's respective spouses, Cynthia and Ronald.

The film was adapted into a TV series by ABS-CBN as Walang Kapalit, aired from April 23 to August 31, 2007.

Synopsis 
After the union between Agnes and Ariston, Noel and Melody became step-siblings but they didn't get along until their years of adulthood. When their parents die, Noel is forced to be Melody's legal guardian despite their lack of closeness. As they grow older, they were married to their respective lovers: Melody marries Ronald and Noel marries Cynthia. One day, Noel and Melody became business partners but their confession of love for each other led to the destruction of their respective marriages and the stigma of their relationship. The affair made Ronald and Cynthia furious on their respective spouses as Noel and Melody continued to love each other.

Cast

Release 
The film was released by Vanguard Films on March 7, 1985. It became a blockbuster in its theatrical run as well as Mike de Leon's commercially successful film to date.

It was restored by the ABS-CBN Film Restoration Project and Central Digital Lab, supervised by Rick Hawthorne and Manet Dayrit. The restoration of Hindi Nahahati ang Langit was complicated due to the condition of the 35mm negative print.

The film's restored version was released on November 11, 2014, in Trinoma Cinema as part of the Cinema One Originals film festival.

References

External links 

1985 films
Philippine romantic drama films
Star Cinema films
Filipino-language films